The Boguaçu State Park is a state park in the state of Paraná, Brazil.

Location

The Boguaçu River is affected by urban pressure from Guaratuba, with landfill in the river's estuary within the state park on an area where the city disposed of its garbage for twenty years, with no control over infiltration into the ground.

History

The park is part of the  Guaratuba Environmental Protection Area, which also includes the  Saint-Hilaire/Lange National Park.
It is part of the larger Lagamar mosaic of conservation units:

Notes

Sources

State parks of Brazil
Protected areas of Paraná (state)
1998 establishments in Brazil